This is a list of WBO world champions, showing every world champion certified by the World Boxing Organization (WBO). The WBO is one of the four major governing bodies in professional boxing, and has awarded world championships in 17 different weight classes since 1989.

Boxers who won the title but were stripped due to the title bout being overturned to a no contest are not listed.

r – Champion relinquished title.
s – Champion stripped of title.

Atomweight

Mini flyweight

Junior flyweight

Flyweight

Junior bantamweight

Bantamweight

Junior featherweight

Featherweight

Junior lightweight

Lightweight

Junior welterweight

Welterweight

Junior middleweight

Middleweight

Super middleweight

Light heavyweight

Heavyweight

See also

 List of current female world boxing champions
 List of female undisputed world boxing champions
 List of WBA female world champions
 List of WBC female world champions
 List of IBF female world champions
 List of WIBO world champions

References

Female
Women's boxing
WBO
WBO